Nikolay Kolesov may refer to:
Nikolai Borisovich Kolesov (1956–1998), Soviet soccer player
Nikolay Alexandrovich Kolesov (b. 1956), Russian politician, Governor of Amur Oblast